Ilija Fonlamov Francisković (Niš, February 16, 1996) is a Serbian painter, known for his official painting of Celebration of 1700 years of the Edict of Milan - The Emperor's edict.

Life and career 
Ilija Fonlamov Francisković (born 16 February 1996) was born  in Niš in family of German-Serbian origins. Firstly, his family moved from Germany to Banat in late 17.century, and then, finally to Niš. He began painting at age of 6, but seriously since age of 12. Because of his style during a school exchange visit in Austria he was recognized as the reincarnation of the German Renaissance painter of the 16th century Matthias Grünewald. He attributed the epithets Wunderkind and Supertalent, precisely because of his age and the fact that he began to produce very early, also because of the absence of formal art education. In 2013. he painted official painting of Celebration of 1700 years of Edict of Milan in Niš. The painting which helped him to become known was painted in honor of the victims of the Holocaust in Serbia in 2011. Its name is Jew and his faith. Because of talent he was suggested to  improve his talent on the Vienna Academy of Fine Arts, but also on High School of Fine and Applied Arts in Paris. He is the youngest and one of the first Serbian artists whose works to be noticed by two German auction houses, Neumeister from Munich, and the auction house Aukcionata from Berlin. During the assessment of his three paintings: The Evangelist, Flower of God and The resurrection of Christ, he got the title  Prince of European painting of the current decade. His greatest inspiration is Christianity, both Orthodox as well as Catholic. Because of his mixed origins, he feels as German, as well as Serb, Montenegrin and Bulgarian, but primarily as citizen of the world. He is occupied by humanitarian work and writing.

Sources 
 http://www.kurir.rs/zabava/pop-kultura/ilija-fonmalov-prija-mi-sto-me-zovu-cudom-od-deteta-clanak-1554545
 http://www.juznevesti.com/Drushtvo/Slika-bez-dana-skole-slikarstva.sr.html
 http://www.belami.rs/novac-od-prodate-slike-andreji-za-lecenje/
 http://www.juznevesti.com/Drushtvo/Novac-od-prodate-slike-daje-za-lecenje-Andreje.sr.html
 https://web.archive.org/web/20141022061948/http://www.prva.rs/web-tv/info/tacno1/14163/tacno-1---18092014/43301/mladi-slikar-ilija.html
 http://www.vijesti.me/caffe/talentovani-slikar-i-pisac-bi-kotorankom-da-obraduje-crnu-goru-853232 
 http://www.blic.rs/Vesti/Srbija/549047/Talentovani-Nislija-uprkos--pozivu-sa-Sorbone-ostao-u-Srbiji
 
 http://www.juznevesti.com/Drushtvo/Slike-mladog-Nislije-procenjuje-aukcijska-kuca-iz-Minhena.sr.html
 https://web.archive.org/web/20151003214706/http://spiritus-movens.me/kultura/09/27/ilija-fonlamov-franciskovic-talentovani-slikar-i-pisac-bi-kotorankom-da-obraduje-crnu-goru/
 https://fonlamov.wordpress.com/biografija-2/
 

1996 births
Living people
Serbian painters